Beed railway station is an upcoming railway station in Beed district, Maharashtra. Its code is BEED. It will serve Beed city. The station consists of one platform. The work on this rail line is expected to be finished year 2023.

First train from Ahmednagar to Narayandoho ran on 19 March 2017.
Second train run 26 Feb 2019 Ahmednagar to Solapurwadi 37 km
Third run fro. Solapurwadi to Ashti on 29 Dec 2021,

References

Railway stations in Beed district
Solapur railway division
Proposed railway stations in India
Proposed infrastructure in Maharashtra